Middleton railway station was a short-lived rural flag station in the Wairarapa region of New Zealand’s North Island.  It was located on the Wairarapa Line between the stations of Clareville (to the south) and Waingawa (to the north) near what was known as West Taratahi Road (now Wiltons Road).  It opened in 1880 but was closed just over a decade later in 1891.

History 
Following the opening of the Greytown Branch in May 1880, construction of the line northwards steadily progressed towards Masterton.  The first train was able to cross the Waingawa River in late July and a station had been erected at Middleton by the end of August.  The station opened to all traffic along with the Woodside – Masterton section of the line on 1 November 1880.

Facilities at Middleton were few and consisted of a platform and passenger shelter.  The Working Timetable also lists a loading bank and up to two private sidings were also listed though not after 1884.

Freight traffic didn't officially begin until 1881 by which time the station had been receiving passenger trains for several months.  The station was last listed in the October 1889 Working Timetable and was closed to all traffic from 1 July 1891. See NZR notice of 3 June 1881 

The station was located inbetween the rural settlements of East and West Taratahi however, the station does not seem to ever have been referred to as Taratahi, rather it was Waingawa which bore the name Taratahi until 1921. There is some evidence to the contrary however, such as a modern list of Wairarapa stations that lists a Taratahi station 1.23 km south of Middleton that had been closed.

Footnotes 

Rail transport in Wellington
Defunct railway stations in New Zealand
Buildings and structures in the Wairarapa
Railway stations opened in 1880
Railway stations closed in 1891